Eliza Anne Fraser (c.1798 – 1858) was a Scottish woman who was aboard a ship that wrecked at an island off the coast of Queensland, Australia, on 22 May 1836, and who claimed she was taken in by the Badtjala (Butchella) people. She later wrote of her experience and claimed to have been captured by Aboriginal people. Fraser Island is named after her; it is also known by the Aboriginal names of K'Gari and Gari.

Life
She was the wife of Captain James Fraser, master of the Stirling Castle. There were 18 people aboard the ship and a cargo mainly of spirits, which may have been involved in the accident. They struck a reef hundreds of kilometres north of K'gari. They then launched a longboat and a pinnace, the latter of which landed on the northern side of Waddy Point on K'gari. The 11 survivors split up into two groups, Eliza and her husband in the second group, and attempted to trek south, surviving on pandanus and berries until they reached Hook Point. Eliza later claimed she was captured by the Badtjala; her husband either died from starvation or from his injuries. Many other survivors of the same ship wreck later disputed Eliza's claims of capture and ill treatment. Other white people had previously been taken in by the Badtjala people and had been treated extremely well. Descendants of the Badtjala people were told through Indigenous oral history that Eliza was viewed as a mad woman and mentally unwell. Eliza Fraser's claim eventually led to the massacre and dispossession of the island's tribe.

Eliza was found by John Graham, an escaped Irish convict who had lived for six years with the natives of Wide Bay and had mastered their language. Whether John Graham acted alone in rescuing Eliza is a matter of some conjecture. For many years her rescuer was thought to have been another escaped convict, David Bracewell (though sometimes reported as Bracefell or Bracefield). Bracewell became the rescuer in later accounts, enhanced by the fictional tale that Bracewell had led Eliza overland to the outskirts of present-day Brisbane where, rather than as promised, seeking his pardon in return for his assistance, she threatened to betray him for having taken advantage of her. Official records show, to the contrary, that it was the convict John Graham who walked with her from Fig Tree Point, a corroboree ground near Lake Cootharaba north of present-day Noosa onto the ocean beach near present-day Teewah. Here they met the waiting Lieutenant Otter and his small band of soldiers and convict volunteers. They proceeded north along the beach to the main rescue party waiting at Double Island Point from where Eliza was taken by longboat to the penal settlement at Moreton Bay.

Eliza later secretly married another sea captain (Captain Alexander Greene) in Sydney and they both returned to England aboard his ship, the Mediterranean Packet. Controversy followed when she appeared before the Lord Mayor of London to request that a charity appeal be set up for her three children as she was left penniless after her husband had died, not mentioning her marriage to Captain Greene or the £400 received in Sydney by a fund set up to help her. Sensationalised accounts of her experience were published in London.

Cultural references
Patrick White wrote a fictionalised account of the incident in the 1976 novel A Fringe of Leaves. Others who wrote her story include André Brink, Kenneth Cook and Michael Ondaatje.

Sidney Nolan painted a wide range of personal interpretations of historical and legendary figures, including Eliza Fraser. The Eliza Fraser story was a theme to which painter Sidney Nolan returned over the years. His first Mrs. Fraser painting was in 1947 when he visited K'gari. The crouching, bedraggled form with downcast head obscured by matted hair is one of his best known images.  Over the years Nolan emphasised the Bracefell (as he called Bracewell) betrayal story, and his iconic Fraser image has become emblematic of what he saw as his betrayal by Sunday Reed.

In 1976 a drama film titled Eliza Fraser (The Adventures of Eliza Fraser was an alternate title) was made about her. Susannah York played the title role, and the film was directed by Tim Burstall. It was the first Australian film with a seven-figure budget, costing $1.2 million to make.

See also
 White woman of Gippsland
 William Buckley (convict)

References

Bibliography
  Australian Dictionary of Biography: Fraser, Eliza Anne (1798-1858)
 First published by Michael Joseph, 1971.

Goldie, Terry (1989). Fear and Temptation: The Image of the Indigene in Canadian, Australian, and New Zealand Literatures. Toronto: McGill-Queens University Press.
Russell, Lynette, et al., eds (1998). Constructions of Colonialism: Perspectives on Eliza Fraser's Shipwreck. Wellington: Leicester University Press.

Further reading 

 

History of Queensland
People from Queensland
Eliza
Shipwreck survivors
1858 deaths
Year of birth uncertain
18th-century Australian women
19th-century Australian women